The 2012–13 Cymru Alliance (known as the Huws Gray Alliance for sponsorship reasons) is a football league in Wales. It is the top division of football in North & Central Wales and the second tier of the Welsh football league system.

The 2012–13 Cymru Alliance season, also known as Huws Gray Alliance for sponsoring purposes, is the 23rd season of the Cymru Alliance, the second-level association football league in north Wales. 

The champions are eligible for promotion to the 2013–14 Welsh Premier League, pending a licence application and approval, while the bottom three teams will be relegated to one of the three feeder leagues of the Cymru Alliance.

Teams

League table

References 

Cymru Alliance seasons
2
Wales